Dominica competed at the 2014 Winter Olympics in Sochi, Russia from 7 to 23 February 2014, in its Winter Olympics debut. The nation was represented by two cross-country skiers.

Competitors

Cross-country skiing 

In November 2012, the International Olympic Committee asked Dominica if it had athletes to compete in the 2014 Winter Olympics. In response, Angelica and Gary di Silvestri created the Dominica Ski Federation and qualified for the games. Angelica was born and raised in Italy and Gary was from the United States. Neither had cross-country skied before the age of 30.

Neither skier completed their event in Sochi. Angelica did not start her race after an injury during training. Had Angelica competed in her race, she would have become the oldest woman to compete in a cross-country skiing race at the Winter Olympics, surpassing Norway's Hilde Gjermundshaug Pedersen, who competed as a 41-year-old at the 2006 Winter Olympics in Turin. Gary did not finish due to illness.

The appearance of the di Silvestris received criticism from several journalists; neither athlete had any familial ties to Dominica or had ever resided there, and they had only visited the island on a single occasion. They received Dominican citizenship from an investment program and qualified for the Games by competing in low-level races where they finished among the last-place skiers, but earned some qualifying points simply by virtue of being finishers. Several stories cited the team as examples for the need to close loopholes in both acquisition of citizenship and in maintaining competitive qualifying standards for the Games.

Distance

References

External links 
 
 

Nations at the 2014 Winter Olympics
2014
2014 in Dominica sport